Marie Schnür, or Marie Marc-Schnür, (19 February 1869, Krien – 16 February 1934, Swinemünde) was a German painter, illustrator and silhouette maker. From 1907 to 1908, she was married to the painter Franz Marc.

Biography
 
She was one of five daughters born to a wealthy family from Coburg, on a large estate, the garden house of which is still preserved as a historical monument. She attended the art school operated by the "Verein der Berliner Künstlerinnen" (Association of Women Artists), where her primary instructor was the sculptor Conrad Fehr. She also studied in Munich with Ludwig Schmid-Reutte and Wilhelm Dürr. After that, she became an illustrator, doing books and sheet music and working for the magazine Jugend, where her works often appeared on the front page.

Her career advanced through her friendship with the artist,  and her participation in an art group known as "Die Scholle". She was also part of the circle around Countess Marion Kaulitz (1865-?), a maker of artistic dolls that are now rare collector's items. Schnür made several of her own that were displayed at the Warenhaus Tietz, a famous department store in Berlin.

She was also an instructor at the "Women's Academy" of the "Münchner Künstlerinnenverein", where she taught still-life painting. It was there that she met Franz Marc and Bertha Marie Franck, a student who would become Marc's second wife. They spent the summer of 1906 together, at Marc's home in Kochel am See, possibly engaged in a ménage à trois. 

After only a year, she divorced Marc, charging him with adultery, and thereby prevented him from marrying Franck until 1911, because a dispensation was required.

Not long after the divorce, she went to Swinemünde to live with her family. After that point, little is known about her, although Jugend published what may have been new artwork by her in 1916 and 1918.

Illustrations from Jugend
Digitalized by the Heidelberg University Library
No.25, 1901
No.28, 1901
No.15, 1902
N0.39, 1902
No.43, 1902
No.13, 1904
No.21, 1904
No.30, 1904
N0.12, 1905
No.20, 1905

References

External links

 Letters from Franz Marc to Marie Schnür @ Zeno

1869 births
1934 deaths
19th-century German painters
German illustrators
People from Vorpommern-Greifswald
20th-century German painters
Franz Marc